Karen Krantzcke (1 February 1946 – 11 April 1977) was an Australian tennis player. She achieved a world top ten singles ranking in 1970. In her short career, she made the quarterfinals or better at each of the four Grand Slam championships in both singles and doubles. She also won the Australian Open in doubles, and assisted Australia to victory in the Federation Cup.

At the age of 31, Krantzcke died from a heart attack while jogging.

Early career
Krantzcke, a tall right-handed player, achieved much junior success including winning the Australian junior singles title in 1966.

Professional career
Her most successful season came in 1969/70. After reaching the US Open quarterfinals, she reached the semifinals at the Australian Open and the French Open and then reached the quarterfinals at Wimbledon. At these tournaments, she upset highly ranked players like Virginia Wade, Françoise Dürr, and Judy Tegart Dalton.

During this time, she also combined with Dalton to win the Federation Cup for Australia, remaining undefeated in singles and doubles on the German clay.

After Wimbledon in 1970, 'Kran' took eighteen months off the tour after discovering she was hypoglycemic.

On returning to the tour, she was never able to get back to her best form. She continued to do well in her home Australian championship and reached the semi-finals for the second time in 1977. During her career she defeated Margaret Court, Evonne Goolagong Cawley four times, Billie Jean King twice, Kerry Melville Reid four times, and Virginia Wade. At the New South Wales Open in 1974 Krantzcke defeated Evonne Goolagong Cawley in the final 6-2, 6-3 and at Strathfield in 1969 she defeated Evonne Goolagong Cawley in the final 6-3, 6-4.

Death
While playing on the Challenger circuit in the USA in 1977, Krantzcke suffered a heart attack while jogging. In response to her untimely death, the WTA instituted the Karen Krantzcke Sportsmanship Award which is still awarded annually to a female professional tennis player.

A street in the Canberra suburb of Nicholls, Australian Capital Territory, Krantzcke Crescent, is named after the tennis star.

Team results
Krantzcke played twice in Federation Cup for Australia; in 1966 and 1970. She also represented Australia in the Bonne Bell Cup in 1974.

Grand Slam finals

Doubles (1 title, 3 runners-up)

Grand Slam singles tournament timeline

Note: The Australian Open was held twice in 1977, in January and December.

References

External links
 
 

1946 births
1977 deaths
Australian Championships (tennis) champions
Australian female tennis players
Tennis players from Brisbane
Grand Slam (tennis) champions in women's doubles
Grand Slam (tennis) champions in girls' singles
Australian Championships (tennis) junior champions